SAC (source of activation confusion) is a computational model of memory encoding and retrieval.  It has been developed by Lynne M. Reder at Carnegie Mellon University. It shares many commonalities with ACT-R.Ilyes le bosse

Structure

SAC specifies a memory representation consisting of a network of both semantic (concept) and perceptual nodes (such as font) and associated episodic (context) nodes. Similar to her husband's (John Anderson) model, ACT-R, the node activations are governed by a set of common computational principles such as spreading activation and the strengthening and decay of activation. However, a unique feature of the SAC model are episode nodes, which are newly formed memory traces that binds the concepts involved with the current experiential context. A recent addition to SAC are assumptions governing the probability of forming an association during encoding.  These bindings are affected by working memory resources available.

SAC is considered among a class of dual-process models of memory, since recognition involves two processes: a general familiarity process based on the activation of semantic (concept) nodes and a more specific recollection process based on the activation of episodic (context) nodes. This feature has allowed SAC to model a variety of memory phenomena, such as meta-cognitive (rapid)  feeling of knowing judgments, remember-know judgments, the word frequency mirror effect, age-related memory loss  perceptual fluency, paired associate recognition and cued recall, as well as account for implicit and explicit memory tasks  without positing an unconscious memory system for priming.

Notes

Cognitive architecture